The 2001–02 season was the 105th season of competitive football in Scotland.

Key events
Celtic, domestic treble winners a year earlier, retain their Premier League title.

After failing to win anything the previous season, Rangers won the Scottish Cup and League Cup under their new manager Alex McLeish.

Airdrieonians, who narrowly missed out on promotion to the Premier League as First Division runners-up, went out of business of 1 May with debts of nearly £3million. Later that month, however, a new club representing the town of Airdrie - Airdrie United - was formed, with ambitions of gaining Scottish league status for the 2002–03 season.

Livingston, in the Premier League for the first time, finished third and qualified for the UEFA Cup. Livingston, who were known as Meadowbank Thistle until relocating from Edinburgh to Livingston in 1995 and played their first season in their new location as a Third Division club.

Falkirk avoided relegation from the First Division and Stenhousemuir avoided relegation from the Second as a result of the league losing a member. The vacant place in the Third Division was occupied by Gretna, who until then had played in the English non-league system.

Despite Gretna beating Airdrie United to the vacant league place, Airdrie United still gained a league place for the 2002–03 season – in the Second Division – as they bought out the debt-ridden club Clydebank.

Queen of the South won the Second Division league title for the first time in 51-years since they won the Division B league title in season 1950–51. These were the only two occasions that the Dumfries club had won a league title in their history, that was up until they won their third ever league title in season 2012–13, when they won the Second Division once again.

League Competitions

Scottish Premier League

The 2001–02 Scottish Premier League was won by Celtic. Rangers finished second and therefore qualified for a UEFA Champions League place alongside Celtic. Livingston, in their debut season in Scotland's top division, qualified for the UEFA Cup along with Aberdeen. St Johnstone were relegated to the First Division.

Scottish First Division

Scottish Second Division

Scottish Third Division

Other honours

Cup honours

Individual honours

SPFA awards

SFWA awards

Scottish clubs in Europe

Average coefficient - 6.625

Scotland national team

Key:
(H) = Home match
(A) = Away match
WCQG6 = World Cup Qualifying - Group 6

See also
2001–02 Aberdeen F.C. season
2001–02 Celtic F.C. season
2001–02 Dundee United F.C. season
2001–02 Rangers F.C. season

Notes

References

External links
Scottish Premier League official website
Scottish Football League official website
BBC Scottish Premier League portal 
BBC Scottish Football League portal 

 
Seasons in Scottish football